The ABC Champions Cup 2001 was the 12th staging of the ABC Champions Cup, the basketball club tournament of Asian Basketball Confederation. The tournament was held in Dubai, United Arab Emirates between June 1 to 8, 2001.

Preliminary round

Group A

Group B

Knockout round

Semifinals

Finals

Final standings

Awards
Most Valuable Player:  Johnny Rhodes (Al-Ittihad)
Most Valuable Coach:  Abdul Hameed Ibrahim (Al-Ittihad)
Best Rebounder:  Eddie Washington (ASPAC)
Best Three Point Shooter:  Darren Henrie (Winling)
Best Scorer:  Andre Pitts (Al-Wahda)
Best Sixth Man:  Mohammed Yousuf (Al-Rayyan)
Best Sportsmanship:  Assane N'Diaye (Sagesse)
Fair Play:  Al-Ahli

References
Asia-Basket

2001
B
Champions Cup
International basketball competitions hosted by the United Arab Emirates